The Burma Legislature was the legislative body of British Burma from 1936 to 1947. As an elected body, the Legislature of Burma was a bicameral legislature consisting of the 36-seat Senate and the 132-seat House of Representatives.

Establishment
The Government of India Act 1935 separated Burma from British India as of 1 April 1937, and created a 36-seat Senate and a 132-seat House of Representatives.

Presidents of the Senate

Speakers of the House of Representatives

Notable legislation
In 1938, the Legislature of Burma attempted to remedy the dispossession of rural Burmese farmers who were displaced by Indians, in particular, the Chettiars, by passing the Tenancy Act, Land Purchase Act, and Land Alienation Act. The Tenancy Act intended to safeguard tenants from eviction and to fix fair rents, while the Land Purchase Act allowed the government to purchase large swathes of land owned by non-agriculturalists to be resold on a tenancy basis to genuine farmers. In 1938, the Legislature passed into law the progressive University Act.

References

Legislatures of Myanmar
History of Myanmar
Organizations established in 1936
Imperial Legislative Council of India
Defunct bicameral legislatures
1936 establishments in Burma
Organizations disestablished in 1947
1947 disestablishments in Asia